The Diocese of Huarí is a Latin Church ecclesiastical territory or diocese of the Catholic Church in Peru. Erected as a Territorial Prelature in 1958, elevation to a full diocese occurred in April 2008. It is a suffragan diocese in the ecclesiastical province of the metropolitan Archdiocese of Trujillo.

History
On 15 May 1958 Pope Pius XII established the Territorial Prelature of Huarí with territory taken from the Huánuco and the Diocese of Huaraz.  It was elevated to a diocese by Pope Benedict XVI on 2 April 2008.

Bishops

Ordinaries
Marco Libardoni, O.S.I. † (15 May 1958 – 25 Oct 1966)
Dante Frasnelli Tarter, O.S.I. † (3 Aug 1967 – 13 Jun 2001)
Antonio Santarsiero Rosa, O.S.I. (13 Jun 2001 – 4 Feb 2004) Appointed, Bishop of Huacho
Ivo Baldi Gaburri † (4 Feb 2004 – 11 Jun 2021)

Auxiliary bishop
Giorgio Barbetta (2019-)

References

Roman Catholic dioceses in Peru
Roman Catholic Ecclesiastical Province of Trujillo
Christian organizations established in 1958
Roman Catholic dioceses and prelatures established in the 20th century
1958 establishments in Peru